A principality is a monarchical feudatory or sovereign state, ruled or reigned over by a monarch with the title of prince or princess.

Principality may also refer to:

 Principality (angel), an order in the Christian angelic hierarchy
 Principality Building Society, a financial services provider based in Cardiff, Wales 
 Millennium Stadium, Cardiff, Wales, sometimes referred to as the Principality